Athanasios Prodromitis (born 29 February 2004) is a Greek professional footballer who plays as a centre-back for Super League 2 club Panathinaikos B.

References

2004 births
Living people
Greek footballers
Super League Greece 2 players
Panathinaikos F.C. B players
Association football defenders
Footballers from Agrinio